Gustav Noske (9 July 1868 – 30 November 1946) was a German politician of the Social Democratic Party (SPD). He served as the first Minister of Defence (Reichswehrminister) of the Weimar Republic between 1919 and 1920. Noske has been a controversial figure because although he was a member of the socialist movement, he used army and paramilitary forces to bloodily suppress the socialist/communist uprisings of 1919.

Early life
Noske was born on 9 July 1868 in Brandenburg an der Havel, Prussia. He was the son of the weaver Karl Noske (born 1838) and the manual labourer Emma Noske (née Herwig, born 1843). From 1874 to 1882 he went to primary and secondary school (Volks- and Bürgerschule). In 1882 to 1886 he was apprenticed as a basket maker at the Reichsteinische Kinderwagenfabrik and travelled to Halle, Frankfurt, Amsterdam and Liegnitz as a journeyman. In 1884, Noske joined the Social Democratic Party (SPD) and he also became a union member. In 1892, Noske was elected chairman of the Brandenburg SPD.

He married Martha Thiel (1872–1949) at Brandenburg in 1891. They had one son and two daughters.

From 1897 to 1902 Noske was politically active at the local level and worked as an editor at social democratic newspapers in Brandenburg and Königsberg (Volkstribüne). From 1902 to 1918 he was chief editor at the paper Volksstimme in Chemnitz. In the 1907 German federal election, Noske was elected to the Reichstag of the German Empire for the SPD where he remained through 1918 as representative of the Chemnitz Reichstag constituency.

Within the SPD he was an expert on military, navy and colonial issues. After 1912, Noske was Koreferent of the Reichstag for the Navy budget. In 1914, he published a book Kolonialpolitik und Sozialdemokratie in which he argued in favour of German colonialism. He was known as a reformist, one of those in the SPD who wanted to achieve their political goals within the existing system, and as someone who was not much interested in fundamental theoretical debates.

First World War
During the First World War, Noske was part of the centre of the SPD, which also included Friedrich Ebert and Philipp Scheidemann, and supported the war as a defensive measure. Noske supported the war loans, but he also argued in favour of a stronger political position for the Reichstag. In 1916 to 1918, he was the parliamentary speaker of a commission appointed by the government to investigate military procurement and related excess profits by contractors (Kommission für die Überprüfung der Kriegslieferungen). In that function, Noske helped to shed light on the business practices involved and to expand the authority of the parliament.

German Revolution and civil war

In October 1918, Noske became a member of the leadership of the SPD Reichstag group. When the Kiel mutiny started in early November, Prince Max von Baden, the new chancellor, sent Noske to Kiel to negotiate an end to the revolt. The mutineers welcomed Noske and elected him as Chairman of the Soldiers' Council (later "Governor"), as they considered him—a Social Democrat—to be on their side. Within days he had succeeded in restoring the authority of the officers and in making the mutineers who had remained in Kiel resume their normal duties. Max von Baden and his successor as chancellor, Friedrich Ebert, who was a close personal friend of Noske's, were pleased with Noske's achievement. Noske remained in Kiel until December 1918.

As a result of the revolt of the Volksmarinedivision just before Christmas 1918, the representatives of the Independent Social Democrats (USPD) left the revolutionary government of the Council of the People's Deputies (Rat der Volksbeauftragten) at the end of the month and Noske was one of two Majority Social Democrats who took their place on 30 December. Within the government Noske was responsible for military affairs.

In January 1919, Noske and the Freikorps under his command were instrumental in putting down the so-called Spartacist revolt. Today, Marxist historians see this event more as an attempt by the Berlin workers to regain what they thought had been won in the November revolution and what they now seemed to be in the process of losing. The trigger was a trivial event: the head of the Berlin police, a member of the USPD, refused to accept his dismissal. The USPD called for a demonstration of solidarity but was itself surprised by the reaction as hundreds of thousands, many of them armed, gathered in the city centre on 5 January. They seized the newspapers and railway stations. Representatives from USPD and KPD decided to topple the Ebert government.

The next day, however, the gathered masses did not seize government buildings, as the expected support from the military had not materialized. Ebert began negotiations with the leaders of the uprising, but simultaneously prepared for a military response. Noske was made commander of the Freikorps and Ebert worked to mobilise the regular armed forces of the Berlin area on the government's side. From 9 to 12 January, on Ebert's orders, regular forces and Freikorps successfully and bloodily suppressed the uprising.

A few days later, on 15 January 1919, members of the Freikorps Garde-Kavallerie-Schützendivision led by Hauptmann Waldemar Pabst abducted and murdered the socialists Karl Liebknecht and Rosa Luxemburg. Previously, Noske had personally ordered that Liebknecht's telephone line be monitored and Liebknecht's every movement be reported to Pabst.

On 19 January 1919 elections to the Nationalversammlung (national assembly) were held. It met in Weimar and on 13 February 1919 the newly elected president Ebert appointed a new government, led by Philipp Scheidemann. Noske became Reichswehrminister (defence minister).

Over the first half of 1919 Ebert and Noske repeated what they had done in Berlin throughout the Reich. Left-wing uprisings were crushed by brutal military force, employing both regular army and paramilitary Freikorps.

As Reichswehrminister in the governments of Philipp Scheidemann and Gustav Bauer, who succeeded Scheidemann as chancellor in June 1919, Noske oversaw the initial reorganisation of the military after the collapse of 1918. Despite substantial misgivings, he ultimately supported signing of the Treaty of Versailles, which severely curtailed the ability of Germany to maintain an effective military. Beginning in the summer of 1919, there were plots by the Reichswehr leadership to seize power in a military coup. Noske was drawn into these discussions. Although he refused offers to serve as a dictator after a putsch, he never took any steps against the officers who made these offers and failed to report their activities to his fellow members of government.

On 20 January 1920, the Treaty of Versailles came into force, restricting the German army to 100,000 men or less. On 28 February 1920 Noske, following orders of the Interalliierte Militärkontrollkommission, which oversaw Germany's compliance with the Treaty, dissolved the Freikorps Marinebrigaden "Ehrhardt" and "Loewenfeld". The highest ranking general of the Reichswehr, Walther von Lüttwitz, refused to comply, resulting in what became known as the Kapp Putsch.

To restore order, Noske asked the chief of the Truppenamt in the Reichswehr Ministry, General Hans von Seeckt, to order the regular army to put down the putsch. Von Seeckt refused and the government was forced to flee from Berlin. However, a general strike called by the unions, the Social Democrats and the government, as well as the refusal of the bureaucracy to recognise the new (self-declared) chancellor Wolfgang Kapp, resulted in a quick collapse of the coup.

As one of the conditions for ending the general strike, the unions demanded the resignation of Noske as Reichswehrminister. Moreover, some within the SPD were unhappy with his conduct during the crisis and deemed him to have been lacking in energy dealing with the putsch. He resigned on 22 March 1920. Otto Gessler succeeded him. Noske would be the last Social Democrat in this position during the Weimar Republic.

Later career and death
Noske was Governor (Oberpräsident) of the Province of Hanover from 1920 on. He became more conservative and supported Paul von Hindenburg in the elections for Reichspräsident in 1925 and 1932. However, as a Social Democrat he was first relieved of his duties in the spring of 1933 and then dismissed on 1 October by the Nazi government. Noske then moved to Frankfurt. In 1944 he was arrested by the Gestapo under suspicion of involvement in the 20 July plot against Adolf Hitler and imprisoned in the Ravensbrück concentration camp. Noske was freed by advancing Allied troops from a Gestapo prison in Berlin.

He died in Hanover on 30 November 1946 from a stroke while preparing for a lecture tour of the United States. He is buried at Stadtfriedhof Engesohde in Hanover.

Reception
Noske has been called "one of the most forceful and at the same time controversial personalities of his time". For some, Noske had the courage to be (in his own words) "the bloodhound" and prevent Germany from falling into chaos and then tyranny of the type previously experienced by Russia after the Bolshevik October Revolution. Other historians have called him "a primitive brute, who conducted policy according to a simple friend-foe-pattern" and someone who was "unable to differentiate, who was in love with violence, who from his whole mentality would have fitted better into the NSDAP than into the SPD".

References

External links
 
 

1868 births
1946 deaths
People from Brandenburg an der Havel
People from the Province of Brandenburg
Social Democratic Party of Germany politicians
Members of the Council of the People's Deputies
Ministers of the Reichswehr
Members of the 12th Reichstag of the German Empire
Members of the 13th Reichstag of the German Empire
Members of the Weimar National Assembly
German Christians
German anti-communists